Czarnożyły  is a village in Wieluń County, Łódź Voivodeship, in central Poland. It is the seat of the gmina (administrative district) called Gmina Czarnożyły.

The village has an approximate population of 1,300.

References

Villages in Wieluń County